Charles Lamy (May 7, 1849, East Eden, New York – February 21, 1929, Buffalo, New York) was an American merchant and a New York state senator.

Life
He attended the district schools, and then became a clerk in a grocery store in Buffalo. On June 10, 1875, he married Magdalena Urban. In 1876, he opened his own store, and subsequently became the owner of a wholesale and retail grocery, and hardware, flour and feed stores. He was President of the Magnus Beck Brewery, and also engaged in the real estate business. On June 10, 1885, he married Clara B. Demeyer.

He was a member of the New York State Senate from 1894 to 1898, sitting in the 117th, 118th (both 30th D.), 119th, 120th and 121st New York State Legislatures (all three 47th D.).

Sources
 The New York Red Book compiled by Edgar L. Murlin (published by James B. Lyon, Albany NY, 1897; pg. 156f and 404)
 Sketches of the members of the Legislature in The Evening Journal Almanac (1895; pg. 51)
 Charles Lamy in The History of the Germans in Buffalo and Erie County (Part II, pg. 48)

1849 births
1929 deaths
Republican Party New York (state) state senators
Politicians from Buffalo, New York
Businesspeople from Buffalo, New York